The 2018–19 Odense Boldklub season was the club's 130th season, and their 57th appearance in the Danish Superliga. As well as the Superliga, the side was also compete in Sydbank Pokalen.

At the end of the 2017–18 season, head coach Kent Nielsen got fired. Jakob Michelsen signed a 3-year contract on May 29 as new head coach.

OB finished as 3rd in the Superliga regular season despite starting with the worst opening six games in 19 years. OB finished strong in the last half of the season, among other things by winning five games in a row for the first time since 2009. OB had the chance to win the bronze medal, but could not keep going in the play-offs, and therefore it ended up with a 5th place. They finished off by losing to Brøndby in the last and deciding game of the season, and therefore OB also missed the 4th place and Europa League.

But beside to a disappointing conclusion, OB ended up with the best season in eight years by finishing in the top-6.

Season review

The new OB
The 2018–19 season indicated a new start and reboot for the club. Beside from the two new coaches, the club got a new CEO in April. The new CEO, Enrico Augustinus, had ambitions right from the start, and he wanted to create a new OB and make the club great again. Therefore, Augustinus and the board started to focus on better communication and branding, which hopefully would result in more spectators, due to the low average attendance the last few seasons.

Sponsors
After 16 years as a main sponsor, Carlsberg was replaced by Albani. The new main sponsor is located in Odense as well, which makes the club more local. Furthermore, the stadium sponsor was changed too. NGF Nature Energy became new stadium sponsor, and the name was now Nature Energy Park.

Mascot
OB retired their mascot, the tiger Victor, who has been the mascot for over a decade. Instead they brought in an almost identical mascot, a cat, who was the OB mascot in the 90's. At the same time, the old intro song "Eye of the Tiger" was switched out for Carl Nielsen's "Espansiva".

Pre-season
The OB pre-season were kicked off with the signings of academy players Jonathan Harboe and Mads Frøkjær-Jensen. They later on signed Horsens player Alexander Ludwig and academy player Mathias Jørgensen.

OB went on playing five pre-season games by winning them all, against Taarup/Paarup, Östersund, Kalmar, Roskilde and Hvidovre. A perfect start for the new head coach Jakob Michelsen. But people were still doubting the team to do well in the Superliga. The reason for was that sporting director Jesper Hansen did not acquire new big profiles. Although he promised a minimum of three new signings in the summer transfer window, but could not promise it would be done before the first Superliga match.

July
OB's opening Superliga fixture was away against promoted side Vendsyssel on 15 July. OB looked solid, but fell apart in the second half with two quick goals by Vendsyssel. Even though OB scored twice, the Stripes couldn't hold off Vendsyssel from winning 3–2. 17-year old Mathias Jørgensen came in as a sub and scored his first ever Superliga goal.

After the disappointing loss, OB acquired Janus Drachmann from FC Midtjylland on a four-year deal. They also sold André Rømer to Randers.

With the reinforcement they went on playing their home opener against head coach Michelsen's former team SønderjyskE. OB were down 0–2 at half time, but a few substitutions turn things upside down. Jørgensen only needed 13 minutes on the pitch before he could score his second goal in the season, again as a sub, and brought OB on 1–2. Anders K. Jacobsen equalized at the 78 minute-mark. The game ended 2–2 even though OB had the chances for a win.

OB hoped to bring the good play from the SønderjyskE-game into the next game away against Randers. They played well, but it did not bring them the first win of the season. It was Rømer who scored the crucial goal after just 39 seconds, after OB just sold him Randers. After the loss, people started to doubt if Michelsen was the right to take over the head coach position after just one point in three games against Vendsyssel, SønderjyskE and Randers.

August
OB went on playing a tough game against F.C. Copenhagen in the fourth round at home. It looked like they did not stand a chance after the first three game, but OB did quite well. They had their chances to get in front and also could have got a penalty or two. With many missed chances and some bad luck, Dame N'Doye instead scored the deciding goal in favour of Copenhagen in the 85th minute. OB were now sitting in 13th place.

It was now everything or nothing when OB faced Hobro away in the fifth round. A battle between number 13 and 14, and therefore a battle of not sitting in last place. OB was anything else than lucky, and within 35 minutes they were down with 0–3. In the rainy conditions OB had a hard time creating chances, but they got a few in the closing minutes. Rasmus Festersen missed a penalty, and that was just the symbol of the OB's game. Helenius and Festersen made it 2–3, but could not get the equalizer. OB were now sitting in last place. The worst start to a season in 19 years.

Meanwhile Sten Grytebust was rumored away, OB acquired Ivorian goalkeeper Sayouba Mandé. According to a lot of medias, Mandé were brought in to replace Grytebust. Therefore, everybody a sale of the Norwegian keeper.

OB were now facing defending Superliga champion FC Midtjylland at home. Not exactly an easy job against the league's current number 3, who got also got three wins in a row. But against Copenhagen, OB showed that they could play against even the best teams. And that theory was proved correct as OB were the dominating team in the match. The only problem was still getting the opening goal. And after 74 minutes Marc Dal Hende banged Midtjylland in front, and OB were now facing another questionable defeat. But three minutes into stoppage time Nicklas Helenius equalized and got OB their second point of the season. A very deserved point that should have been three points, according to several medias.

First team

Last updated on 20 March 2019

Transfers and loans

Transfers in

Transfers out

Transfer summary

Spending

Summer:  5,450,000 DKK

Winter:  0,000,000 DKK

Total:  5,450,000 DKK

Income

Summer:  0,000,000 DKK

Winter:  15,000,000 DKK

Total:  15,000,000 DKK

Net Expenditure

Summer:  5,450,000 DKK

Winter:  15,000,000 DKK

Total:  9,550,000 DKK

New contracts

Friendlies

Pre-season

Winter

Competitions

Superliga

League table

Results summary

Results by round

Matches

Championship round

Sydbank Pokalen

Squad statistics

Goalscorers
Includes all competitive matches. The list is sorted by shirt number when total goals are equal.

Disciplinary record

References

Odense Boldklub
Odense Boldklub seasons